Oak Hill is a census-designated place (CDP) in the town of Scarborough in Cumberland County, Maine, United States. Prior to the 2020 census, the CDP was known as Scarborough. The population was 4,403 at the 2010 census. It is part of the Portland–South Portland–Biddeford, Maine Metropolitan Statistical Area.

Geography
Oak Hill is located at  (43.59258, -70.333608).

Demographics

As of the census of 2000, there were 3,867 people, 1,615 households, and 1,046 families residing in the CDP. The racial makeup of the CDP was 96.15% White, 0.47% Black or African American, 0.26% Native American, 1.99% Asian, 0.31% from other races, and 0.83% from two or more races. Hispanic or Latino of any race were 0.80% of the population.

There were 1,615 households, out of which 29.4% had children under the age of 18 living with them, 54.4% were married couples living together, 8.1% had a female householder with no husband present, and 35.2% were non-families. 27.1% of all households were made up of individuals, and 11.1% had someone living alone who was 65 years of age or older. The average household size was 2.35 and the average family size was 2.90.

In the CDP, the population was spread out, with 22.3% under the age of 18, 5.8% from 18 to 24, 31.9% from 25 to 44, 22.2% from 45 to 64, and 17.7% who were 65 years of age or older. The median age was 39 years. For every 100 females, there were 88.0 males. For every 100 females age 18 and over, there were 83.9 males.

The median income for a household in the CDP was $46,705, and the median income for a family was $60,037. Males had a median income of $37,891 versus $27,407 for females. The per capita income for the CDP was $24,013. About 5.2% of families and 7.7% of the population were below the poverty line, including 6.4% of those under age 18 and 3.0% of those age 65 or over.

References

Census-designated places in Maine
Portland metropolitan area, Maine
Census-designated places in Cumberland County, Maine